Shalabi is a surname. Notable people with the surname include: 

Abdul Rahman Shalabi, Saudi detainee in Guantanamo Bay
Ali Shalabi, Libyan weightlifter
Hana Shalabi (born 1982), Palestinian prisoner
Iyad Shalabi, Israeli Paralympic swimmer
Menna Shalabi (born 1981), Egyptian actress
Mustafa Shalabi (died 1991), Egyptian charity founder and alleged terrorist
Salah El-Din Shalabi (born 1949), Egyptian water polo player